

54001–54100 

|-bgcolor=#f2f2f2
| colspan=4 align=center | 
|}

54101–54200 

|-id=182
| 54182 Galsarid ||  || Gal Sarid (born 1981) is a research scientist at the Florida Space Institute who studies the thermal evolution of comets and asteroids, and the early compositional evolution of the solar system. || 
|}

54201–54300 

|-id=237
| 54237 Hiroshimanabe ||  || Hiroshi Manabe, Japanese illustrator || 
|-id=288
| 54288 Daikikawasaki ||  || Daiki Kawasaki (born 1996), the discoverer's oldest grandchild. || 
|}

54301–54400 

|-id=362
| 54362 Restitutum ||  || Latin term for "something that has been replaced or restored to its former place"; this minor planet was originally lost soon after discovery, then found again † || 
|-id=391
| 54391 Adammckay ||  || Adam McKay (born 1986) is a postdoctoral fellow at the American University and NASA-GSFC (USA) who studies the volatile composition of comets through high-resolution spectroscopy at optical and IR wavelengths. || 
|}

54401–54500 

|-id=411
| 54411 Bobestelle ||  || George Robert ("Bob") Stetson and Estelle Marie Ives, the discoverer's parents || 
|-id=439
| 54439 Topeka ||  || Topeka, Kansas || 
|}

54501–54600 

|-id=509
| 54509 YORP ||  || YORP effect || 
|-id=510
| 54510 Yakagehonjin ||  || Yakage honjin, located in southwestern Okayama, was a traditional accommodation for the daimyo and other Shogunate officials while on the road in the Edo Period. Only upper-class persons could stay or have meals there. It is designated as an important cultural property of Japan. || 
|-id=521
| 54521 Aladdin ||  || Aladdin is the central character in a well-known folk tale of the same name. The story originates from western China or possibly the Middle East. It tells of Aladdin's battle with evil sorcerers to gain control of a magic lamp containing a genie who emerges to grant wishes whenever the lamp is rubbed. || 
|-id=522
| 54522 Menaechmus ||  || Menaechmus, 4th-century B.C. Greek mathematician, credited with the discovery of the conic sections || 
|-id=563
| 54563 Kinokonasu ||  || Kinoko Nasu (born 1973) is a Japanese author. His best-known works are Tsukihime, Fate/stay night, and Kara no Kyoukai (English title "Garden of Sinners"). All have been produced as anime series. || 
|-id=598
| 54598 Bienor ||  || Bienor, mythological centaur that attended Pirithous' wedding, fought in the ensuing battle against the Lapiths, and was killed by Theseus || 
|}

54601–54700 

|-id=693
| 54693 Garymyers ||  || Gary Myers, American amateur astronomer, member of the Huachuca Astronomy Club || 
|}

54701–54800 

|-id=720
| 54720 Kentstevens ||  || Kent Stevens (born 1952) has considerable expertise in Artificial Intelligence and Modeling and Simulation. He was a former Observatory Director at Hidden Valley Observatory in South Dakota and re-designed, engineered and replaced the original telescope following a severe vandalism incident. || 
|}

54801–54900 

|-id=810
| 54810 Molleigh ||  || Molleigh Elena Struble (1994–2010) grew up near Yerkes Observatory, where she volunteered for educational programs such as one connecting Yerkes and the Science Museum, Tokyo. || 
|-id=820
| 54820 Svenders ||  || Enders Robinson (born 1929) and Sven Treitel (born 1930), American pioneers of applied geophysical signal analysis † || 
|-id=827
| 54827 Kurpfalz ||  || The County Palatine of the Rhine ("Kurpfalz") goes back to a territory of the Holy Roman Empire. In the Congress of Vienna in 1815 it was separated from Rheinland. The region around Heidelberg–Mannheim (now a part of Baden–Württemberg) is today still called "Kurpfalz" referring also to the people talking "Kurpfälzisch". || 
|-id=852
| 54852 Mercatali ||  || Antonio Mercatali (born 1962), an amateur astronomer and astrometrist of minor planets from Livorno, Italy || 
|-id=862
| 54862 Sundaigakuen ||  || Sundaigakuen, a high school in Tokyo, the alma mater of Japanese discoverer Hiroshi Maeno || 
|-id=863
| 54863 Gasnault ||  || Olivier Gasnault (born 1973) specializes in remote sensing and is deeply involved in the exploration of the Moon and Mars, both from orbit and on the ground with the Curiosity Rover. Name and citation provided by S. Le Mouelic. || 
|}

54901–55000 

|-id=902
| 54902 Close ||  || Gary Close (1940–1999), American director of Hopkins Planetarium † || 
|-id=932
| 54932 Waltharris ||  || Walt Harris (born 1964) is a professor at the University of Arizona who studies thin atmospheres with an emphasis on comets. He also develops instrumentation for high-resolving power spectroscopy that has been used in ground and suborbital observations of comets and the interplanetary medium. || 
|-id=963
| 54963 Sotin ||  || Christophe Sotin (born 1958), chief scientist of the proposed Titan orbiter Oceanus at JPL and director of the Laboratory for Planetology and Geodynamics at the University of Nantes || 
|-id=967
| 54967 Millucci ||  || Vincenzo Millucci (born 1947), an Italian science communicator and professor of mathematical physics at the University of Siena. He established the university's Torre Luciana Observatory in Florence. || 
|}

References 

054001-055000